Kim Kianna Mababa Dy (born July 26, 1995) is a Filipino volleyball athlete. She is a member of the Philippines women's national volleyball team and the F2 Logistics Cargo Movers.

Career
Dy studied at De La Salle University and a former member of the university's women's volleyball team. In high school, she played for the DLSZ Junior Archers in the UAAP Girls Division. As a high school player, she received the UAAP girls division Most Valuable Player during Season 73 and Best Blocker award in the seasons Season 74 and Season 75, having won three UAAP volleyball championships from the Season 73 to 75. With NCR Team for Palarong Pambansa in 2012 she won the regional championship.

In 2015, Dy played for the Shopinas.com Lady Clickers and the Meralco Power Spikers in the Philippine Super Liga. She was a member of the Philippines women's national volleyball team that competed in the 2015 Asian Women's Volleyball Championship where it placed 12th out of 14 countries. In 2016, Dy received her very first collegiate-level award, the Most Valuable Player (Finals), after winning the UAAP Season 78 championship against arch-rival, Ateneo.

With F2 Logistics Cargo Movers, Dy won the 2017 PSL Grand Prix Conference championship and was awarded the Second Best Opposite Spiker.

Education
Dy graduated with the degree of Bachelor of Science in Business Management from De La Salle University.

Clubs
  Shopinas.com Lady Clickers (2015)
  Meralco Power Spikers (2015)
  F2 Logistics Cargo Movers (2016–present)

Awards

Individuals
 UAAP Season 73 Juniors' "Most Valuable Player"
 UAAP Season 74 Juniors' "Best Blocker"
 UAAP Season 75 Juniors' "Best Blocker"
 UAAP Season 78 Seniors' Finals' "Most Valuable Player"
 2017 Philippine Superliga Grand Prix "2nd Best Opposite Spiker"
 2021 PNVF Champions League (Women) "Most Valuable Player"
 2021 PNVF Champions League (Women) "Best Opposite Spiker"

Others
 DLSAA Lasallian Sports Achievement Award (2017)
 Gawad Lasalyano (2017)

Collegiate
 2014 UAAP Season 76 volleyball tournaments -  Silver medal, with De La Salle Lady Spikers
 2015 UAAP Season 77 volleyball tournaments -  Silver medal, with De La Salle Lady Spikers
 2016 UAAP Season 78 volleyball tournaments -  Champion, with De La Salle Lady Spikers
 2017 UAAP Season 79 volleyball tournaments -  Champion, with De La Salle Lady Spikers
 2018 UAAP Season 80 volleyball tournaments -  Champion, with De La Salle Lady Spikers

Clubs
 2015 PSL All-Filipino Conference –  Silver medal, with Shopinas.com Lady Clickers
 2016 PSL All-Filipino Conference –  Champion, with F2 Logistics Cargo Movers
 2016 PSL Grand Prix Conference –  Bronze medal, with F2 Logistics Cargo Movers
 2017 PSL All-Filipino Conference –  Silver medal, with F2 Logistics Cargo Movers
 2017 PSL Grand Prix Conference –  Champion, with F2 Logistics Cargo Movers
 2018 PSL Grand Prix Conference -  Silver medal, with F2 Logistics Cargo Movers
 2018 PSL Invitational Cup -  Champion, with F2 Logistics Cargo Movers
 2018 PSL All-Filipino Conference -  Silver medal, with F2 Logistics Cargo Movers
 2019 PSL Grand Prix Conference -  Silver medal, with F2 Logistics Cargo Movers
 2019 PSL All-Filipino Conference -  Champion, with F2 Logistics Cargo Movers
 2019 PSL Invitational Conference -  Champion, with F2 Logistics Cargo Movers
 2021 PNVF Champions League (Women) -  Champion, with F2 Logistics Cargo Movers

References

External links
 Kim Kianna Dy | Volleyverse
 

1995 births
Living people
University Athletic Association of the Philippines volleyball players
Sportspeople from Manila
De La Salle University alumni
Philippines women's international volleyball players
Filipino women's volleyball players
Volleyball players from Metro Manila
Opposite hitters
Middle blockers
Volleyball players at the 2018 Asian Games
Asian Games competitors for the Philippines
21st-century Filipino women